Belaya Kholunitsa is a town and the administrative center of Belokholunitsky District in Kirov Oblast, Russia, located on the river Belaya Kholunitsa (Vyatka's tributary),  northeast of Kirov, the administrative center of the oblast. Population: 

It was previously known as Kholunitsky, Belokholunitsky.

History
It was founded in 1764 due to the construction of an ironworks as the settlement of Kholunitsky. It was later renamed Belokholunitsky when the river it stood on was renamed. It was granted town status in 1965.

Administrative and municipal status
Within the framework of administrative divisions, Belaya Kholunitsa serves as the administrative center of Belokholunitsky District. As an administrative division, it is, together with nine rural localities, incorporated within Belokholunitsky District as the Town of Belaya Kholunitsa. As a municipal division, the Town of Belaya Kholunitsa is incorporated within Belokholunitsky Municipal District as Belokholunitskoye Urban Settlement.

Economy
Industrial companies in the town include a load-and-carry equipment plant, two logging and two forestry companies, a wood processing and furniture-making plant, a bread-making plant, among others.

There are deposits of iron ore, clay, gravel, lime, rubble, and peat in the town.

References

Notes

Sources

External links
Official website of Belaya Kholunitsa 
Directory of organizations in Belaya Kholunitsa 
Unofficial website of Belaya Kholunitsa 
Belaya Kholunitsa Museum 

Cities and towns in Kirov Oblast
Monotowns in Russia
Slobodskoy Uyezd